Christina Judith Perri (born August 19, 1986) is an American singer and songwriter. After her debut single "Jar of Hearts" was featured on the television series So You Think You Can Dance in 2010, Perri signed with Atlantic Records and released her debut extended play, The Ocean Way Sessions. Her debut studio album, Lovestrong (2011), followed soon after and has since been certified platinum by the Recording Industry Association of America (RIAA).

Perri also gained recognition for writing and recording "A Thousand Years", the love theme for the film The Twilight Saga: Breaking Dawn – Part 2 (2012), which appears on the accompanying soundtrack. The song went on to sell over 10 million copies in the United States, being certified Diamond, and the official music video reached two billion views on YouTube in December 2021. She later released her second extended play, A Very Merry Perri Christmas (2012), followed by her second studio album, Head or Heart (2014). After recording the lullaby albums Songs for Carmella (2019) and Songs for Rosie (2021), Perri released her third studio album, A Lighter Shade of Blue (2022).

Early life
Perri was born in Bensalem, Pennsylvania. She is of Italian and Polish descent, and has called her family "very Italian". She has an older brother, Nick Perri, who formerly played guitar with Shinedown, Silvertide, Perry Farrell and Matt Sorum and cousin Dominic Perri.

She graduated from Archbishop Ryan High School in 2004 and later attended the University of the Arts. She taught herself how to play guitar as a 16-year-old by watching a videotape of Shannon Hoon from the group Blind Melon performing on VH1. In college she majored in communication for a year before dropping out to pursue a music career.

She frequently sang and acted in musical theater as a child. Perri claims to have learned to play piano and guitar because she missed hearing music being played in the house when she moved away. According to Perri, whenever she played the guitar or piano, she would sing and "all of a sudden these songs would appear."

Career

Early career
Perri moved to Los Angeles on her 21st birthday. According to Perri, she felt terrified of being over 3,000 miles away from her family, saying that she "cried [her] eyes out every day."

Later that year she married and began to produce music videos for a living. She divorced 18 months later and moved into a small apartment on her own to focus entirely on working on music. She moved back to Philadelphia by the end of 2009; it was during this time that she wrote "Jar of Hearts". She later moved back to Los Angeles, working as a waitress at the Melrose Cafe during the day and recording at night.

2010–2012: Lovestrong

Perri's song "Jar of Hearts" was featured on So You Think You Can Dance during the show of June 30, 2010 in a performance by Billy Bell and Kathryn McCormick. Perri's friend Keltie Knight passed the song to show choreographer Stacey Tookey, as Perri was unsigned at the time. Perri and Knight watched the performance in the audience. Following its exposure on the show, "Jar of Hearts" sold 48,000 digital copies in its first week, debuting on the Billboard Hot 100 at No. 63 and reaching No. 28 on Billboards Hot Digital Songs. Within a month, it had sold more than 100,000 copies. The song peaked at number 17 on the Hot 100.

Following the success of "Jar of Hearts", Perri signed a deal with Atlantic Records on July 21, 2010. She recorded an EP titled The Ocean Way Sessions that was released on November 9, 2010. The second single from Perri's debut album, "Arms", was released on March 15, 2011. She released her debut album, Lovestrong, on May 10, 2011. It debuted at number 4 on the Billboard 200, with first-week sales of 58,000 copies. In the United Kingdom, Lovestrong was the thirteenth highest selling debut album of 2011.

In July 2011, Perri embarked on her first world tour, the Lovestrong Tour, which lasted for almost exactly a year and consisted of 71 dates. Perri released her single "A Thousand Years", which appeared on the soundtrack of The Twilight Saga: Breaking Dawn – Part 1, on October 18, 2011. The song debuted at number 63 on the Billboard Hot 100 and peaked at number 31, but has been certified 4× platinum with over 4 million sales in the US alone since. The song is Perri's most successful single to date. The album's third and final single, "Distance", was released on March 20, 2012.

Perri also announced in San Juan, Puerto Rico during her Lovestrong Tour that she had begun to work on her second studio album. In addition, in late 2012 Perri was the opening act for Jason Mraz's concert tour, the "Love Is a Four Letter Word Tour", across continental North America in 2012.

On August 1, 2012, she announced via Facebook that A Very Merry Perri Christmas EP would be released on October 16, 2012. The album consisted of one original song, "Something About December", which served as the lead single, as well as four covers. Perri re-recorded "A Thousand Years" for The Twilight Saga: Breaking Dawn – Part 2 soundtrack with guest vocals from Steve Kazee, titled "A Thousand Years, Pt. 2". On May 14, 2013, she received the BMI award for her song "A Thousand Years" at the 61st annual BMI Pop Awards held in Beverly Hills, California.

2013–present: Head or Heart, Songs for Carmella, Songs for Rosie, and A Lighter Shade of Blue

In 2013, Perri began regularly tweeting and posting pictures on Instagram regarding her second studio album's progress using the hashtag "#albumtwo". In February, Perri partnered with the non-profit organization To Write Love on Her Arms on a three-stop tour to raise money for the charity and debuted a brand new song from her second studio album, titled "I Believe", at the shows. On June 21, Perri tweeted announcing that the second album was coming together.

On November 11, 2013, Perri announced that her first single from her new album is called "Human". The song was released on November 18, 2013, on iTunes. Perri performed the song on The Queen Latifah Show the same day. On November 28, 2013, Perri revealed that her second studio album would be titled Head or Heart and it was released on April 1, 2014. On May 29, it was announced that she would open Demi Lovato's new North American World Tour's dates. Perri later announced that her second concert tour would be titled the Head or Heart Tour, which began in April 2014. On June 9, she released the second single from her second album, "Burning Gold". with the video released on August 1. On December 19, 2014, Perri performed in the annual "Christmas in Washington" holiday concert.

In June 2016, it was announced that Perri would feature on the title track of Lindsey Stirling's third studio album, Brave Enough. The album was released on August 19, 2016. On December 14, 2018, Perri announced her first lullaby album dedicated to her daughter titled Songs for Carmella: Lullabies & Sing-a-Longs. The album was released on Carmella's first birthday on January 17, 2019.

Following the stillbirth of Perri's daughter Rosie, she released the album Songs for Rosie on November 24, 2021, the first anniversary of Rosie's death. The album contains lullabies and tribute songs for Rosie, and is a companion album to Songs for Carmella. In March 2022, Perri released the single "Evergone" with an accompanying music video from her forthcoming third studio album. The album, A Lighter Shade of Blue, was released by Elektra Records on July 15, 2022.

Personal life
Perri and Paul Costabile became engaged in June 2017 and were married on December 12, 2017. In August 2017, Perri announced she was pregnant with their first child. Perri gave birth to their daughter in January 2018.

In January 2020, Perri said she was "completely heartbroken" after suffering a miscarriage at 11 weeks. In July, Perri announced she was pregnant for a third time. On November 10, 2020, Perri said she was experiencing pregnancy complications, before two weeks later, Perri said that her daughter was stillborn, stating: "She is at peace now and will live forever in our hearts." In May 2022, Perri announced she was pregnant with their fourth child. Perri gave birth to their daughter in October 2022.

Discography

Lovestrong (2011)
Head or Heart (2014)
Songs for Carmella: Lullabies & Sing-a-Longs (2019)
Songs for Rosie (2021)
A Lighter Shade of Blue (2022)

Awards and nominations
{| class=wikitable
|-
! Year !! Awards !! Work !! Category !! Result
|-
| rowspan=2|2011
| MP3 Music Awards
| rowspan=2|"Jar of Hearts"
| The BNC Award 
| 
|-
| 4Music Video Honours
| Best Video
| 
|-
| rowspan=3|2013
| BMI Pop Awards
| rowspan=2|"A Thousand Years"
| Award-Winning Song
| 
|-
| rowspan=2|Musicnotes.com Song of the Year Awards
| Song of the Year 
| 
|-
| Herself 
| Publisher of the Year 
|

Concert tours
Headlining
 Lovestrong Tour (2011–2012)
 Head or Heart Tour (2014)

Co-Headlining
 Girls Night Out, Boys Can Come Too Tour (with Colbie Caillat and Rachel Platten) (2015)

Opening act
Love Is a Four Letter Word Tour (2012)
Demi World Tour (2014)
Native Tour (2014)
x Tour (2015)
Billy Joel @ Citizen Bank Park (2016)
Ed Sheeran Tour (2016)

References

External links

1986 births
Living people
American women singer-songwriters
American people of Polish descent
American people of Italian descent
Atlantic Records artists
Musicians from Philadelphia
People from Bensalem Township, Pennsylvania
Singer-songwriters from Pennsylvania
21st-century American singers
21st-century American women singers